Serincia lineata is a moth in the subfamily Arctiinae. It was described by Reich in 1933. It is found in Brazil.

References

Natural History Museum Lepidoptera generic names catalog

Moths described in 1933
Lithosiini